Sidney Lewis Gulick (April 10, 1860 – December 20, 1945) was an educator, author, and missionary who spent much of his life working to promote greater understanding and friendship between Japanese and American cultures.

Biography
Gulick was born April 10, 1860 in Ebon Atoll, Marshall Islands. His father was missionary Luther Halsey Gulick Sr. (1828–1891), and mother was Louisa Mitchell (Lewis) Gulick (1830–1893). He was the brother of Luther Halsey Gulick, Jr. and grandson of missionary Peter Johnson Gulick (1796–1877). He graduated from Oakland High School in 1879.
He received an A.B. degree from Dartmouth College with his brother Edward Leeds Gulick in 1883, an A.M. degree in 1886 and a D.D. degree in 1903. He also held D.D. degrees from Yale and Oberlin College.

He was ordained a Congregational minister in 1886, and then was a supply minister at the Willoughby Avenue Mission, Brooklyn. He married Clara May Fisher (1860?–1941) on November 7, 1887.

In 1888 Gulick traveled to Japan, where he worked for the American Board of Commissioners for Foreign Missions through the following twenty-five years. He mastered the Japanese language, fluently giving sermons and writing books in it. He taught English, science, and religion at several schools and universities in Japan. In his last seven years there, he served as Professor of Theology at Doshisha University in Kyoto and as lecturer at the Kyoto Imperial University.

After returning to the United States in 1913, Gulick was dismayed to find growing discrimination and resentment against Japanese Americans. He campaigned against California's anti-Asian legislation and urged equality of treatment for all nations. An ardent worker in the cause of world peace, he was a vigorous proponent of the entry of the United States into the World Court.

After passage of the Immigration Act of 1924, which virtually halted immigration to the U.S. from countries seen as "undesirable", Gulick decided that the most productive way to encourage international understanding was through children.

Gulick was instrumental in forming the "Committee on World Friendship Among Children". In 1927, its first project was to organize the sending of American dolls to Japan for Hinamatsuri, an annual doll festival. This project had an overwhelming response from the American public, and altogether, 12,739 of these "American Blue-eyed Dolls" were sent to Japanese schools, each with an accompanying letter professing friendship.

The Japanese later sent 58 dolls back to the United States – one for each state, plus more for states with larger populations. These Japanese friendship dolls were around three feet high, and were dressed in traditional Japanese clothing. They came with a trunk full of their belongings including equipment for the tea ceremony. After these dolls toured the United States, they went back to their state.

During World War II, many of the dolls, especially the ones in Japan, were seen as the enemy and were burned or stabbed. Many people saved dolls by hiding them until the war was over.

Gulick wrote many books about Japanese-American relations.

He died in Boise, Idaho, on December 20, 1945. According to his grandson, Sidney Gulick III, "his ashes were entombed in three places: alongside his father's in Springfield, Massachusetts; in Boise, Idaho; and in Kobe." He had three sons, Luther Halsey Gulick (1892–1993) who developed theories of government policy, Leeds Gulick (1894–1975), and Sidney Lewis Gulick Jr. (1902–1988), and two daughters, Mrs. Leverett Davis and Mrs. John Barrow. His grandson mathematics professor Denny Gulick (Sidney Lewis Gulick III) has tried to revive the doll exchange project.

Family tree

Selected works
 
 
 
 
 
 America and the Orient; outlines of a constructive policy (1916)
 Comprehensive immigration policy and program (1916)
 
 Japanese in California (1921)
  
 
 International goodwill (1924)
 New factors in American Japanese relations and a constructive proposal (1924)
 Toward understanding Japan; constructive proposals for removing the menace of war (1935)

Japanese titles
 Shinshinkaron (1911)
 Jinrui shinkaron / Shidoni Gyurikku cho. (1913)
 Nihon e yoseru sho / Gyurikku Hakase (1939)

Biography
 Advocate of understanding : Sidney Gulick and the search for peace with Japan by Sandra C. Taylor, Kent State University Press, 1984.

Notes

External links
 
 
 Sidney Gulick at the Open Collections Program

1860 births
1945 deaths
Oberlin College alumni
Congregationalist missionaries in Japan
American Congregationalist missionaries
American Congregationalist ministers
American expatriates in Japan